Can You Hear Me? is a French-Canadian television series that is broadcast on Télé-Québec starring Mélissa Bédard, Ève Landry, and Florence Longpré as best friends who live in a low-income neighbourhood of Montreal, Quebec. The series premiered in December 2018, and ran for three seasons, concluding in May 2021. The show is distributed internationally through Netflix.

Cast 

 Mélissa Bédard as Fabiola
 Ève Landry as Carolanne
 Florence Longpré as Ada
 Mehdi Bousaidan as Nassim
 Sophie Desmarais as Amélie
 Isabelle Brouillette as Bianca (Season 1-2; recurring Season 3)
 Victor Andres Turgeon-Trelles as Keven (Season 1-2, guest appearance Season 3)
 Marie-Aimée Cadet as Madan Torino
 Aliyah Elisme as Bébé
 Fayolle Jean Jr. as Jean-Michel (Season 1)
 Guy Jodoin as Alain (Season 1)
 Christian Bégin as Pretzel (Season 1)
 Mani Soleymanlou as Frank (Season 2-3)
 Floyd Lapierre-Poupart as Henri (Season 2)
 Fabiola Nyrva Aladin as Tessa (Season 2-3)
 Marc St-Martin as Léon (Season 2-3)

Episodes

Series overview

Season 1 (2018–19)

Season 2 (2020)

Season 3 (2021)

References

External links
 
 

2010s Canadian comedy-drama television series
2020s Canadian comedy-drama television series
2018 Canadian television series debuts
Télé-Québec original programming
Television shows set in Montreal
Television shows filmed in Montreal